Stanley Brown (June 27, 1929 – August 2, 2009) was an American professional basketball player.

While still a junior at South Philadelphia High School, Brown signed with Philadelphia Sphas in October 1946. He made his professional debut with the Sphas on October 26, 1946.

He played for the Philadelphia Warriors (1947–48, 1951–52) in the BAA and NBA for 34 games. He held the record for the youngest player to play in the NBA/BAA for more than 48 years before the record was broken by Kobe Bryant in 1996. He was 18 years, 139 days at the time of the Warriors' first game of the season.

BAA/NBA career statistics

Regular season

References

External links

1929 births
2009 deaths
American men's basketball players
Philadelphia Sphas players
Philadelphia Warriors players
South Philadelphia High School alumni
Sunbury Mercuries players
Basketball players from Philadelphia
Forwards (basketball)
20th-century American Jews
21st-century American Jews